The 2017 Shanghai Darts Masters was the second staging of the tournament by the Professional Darts Corporation, as a second entry in the 2017 World Series of Darts. The tournament featured eight Asian players who faced eight PDC players and was held at the Pullman Hotel Shanghai South in Shanghai, China from 6–7 July 2017.

Michael van Gerwen was the defending champion, and he retained his title by beating Dave Chisnall 8–0 in the final.

Prize money
The total prize fund was £60,000.

Qualifiers
Eight PDC players – the top eight from the 2017 Premier League – were initially invited. Adrian Lewis subsequently pulled out and was replaced by Gerwyn Price, meaning that the eight players invited were the same as had been invited for the previous World Series event, the 2017 Dubai Duty Free Darts Masters. They are seeded according to the World Series Order of Merit:

  Gary Anderson (quarter-finals)
  Michael van Gerwen (winner)
  Peter Wright (quarter-finals)
  Gerwyn Price (quarter-finals)
  Dave Chisnall (runner-up)
  James Wade (semi-finals)
  Phil Taylor (quarter-finals)
  Raymond van Barneveld (semi-finals)

The following Asian players were invited:
  Paul Lim (first round)
  Haruki Muramatsu (first round)
  Royden Lam (first round)
  Hyun-chul Park (first round)

The Chinese qualifiers were:
  Chengan Liu (first round)
  Li Wei Hong (first round)
  Zong Xiao Chen (first round)
  Chen Hai Long (first round)

Draw

References 

Shanghai Darts Masters
World Series of Darts
Sports competitions in Shanghai